Momchilgrad (Turkish: Mestanlı); is a town in the very south of Bulgaria, part of Kardzhali Province in the southern part of the Eastern Rhodopes. According to the 2011 census, Momchilgrad is the largest Bulgarian settlement with a  Turkish majority (75% of the total).

Notable natives include Petar Stoychev (b. 1976), the fastest swimmer across the English Channel until 2012, table tennis player and coach Daniela Gergelcheva (b. 1964), Turkish weightlifter Naim Süleymanoğlu (1967–2017) and singer Zdravko Zhelyazkov from the Riton pop duet.

History 
Momchilgrad becomes part of Bulgaria after the Balkan wars. The previous name of the city is Mestanlı and it is renamed to Momchilgrad in 1934.

References

External links
 Official web site of Municipality Momchilgrad

Towns in Bulgaria
Cities and towns in the Rhodopes
Populated places in Kardzhali Province